Monte Lake is an unincorporated, seasonally inhabited community located at the north end of the lake of the same name. It lies in a valley connecting the Thompson Country to the Okanagan region in the south-central Interior of British Columbia, Canada. The area has a negligible permanent population and is not considered a designated place by Statistics Canada, but seasonal residents can number nearly 3,000. On 5-6 August 2021, the community was destroyed by the White Rock Lake fire.

See also
Monte Lake Provincial Park
Monte Creek, British Columbia
List of communities in British Columbia
White Rock Lake fire

References

Unincorporated settlements in British Columbia
Thompson Country